Pletovarje is a settlement in the Municipality of Šentjur in eastern Slovenia. It lies east of Dramlje and the Slovenian A1 motorway crosses the settlement's territory. The settlement, and the entire municipality, are included in the Savinja Statistical Region, which is in the Slovenian portion of the historical Duchy of Styria.

References

External links
Pletovarje at Geopedia

Populated places in the Municipality of Šentjur